MI17, or Military Intelligence, section 17, was the secretariat to the other  departments of the British Directorate of Military Intelligence. The section has been disbanded long since.

Defunct United Kingdom intelligence agencies
Military communications of the United Kingdom
British intelligence services of World War II
War Office in World War II